Robyn Cooper (born 16 January 1972) is a professional squash player from Australia. She reached a career-high world ranking of World No. 12 in 1996. At the 1998 Commonwealth Games, she won a Silver Medal in the women's doubles, partnering Rachael Grinham.

Cooper represented Australia at the 2000 Women's World Team Squash Championships in Sheffield, England winning a silver medal and two years later she won the gold medal with Australia at the 2002 Women's World Team Squash Championships in Odense, Denmark.

At the 2002 Commonwealth Games, Cooper won a Bronze Medal in the mixed doubles, partnering Joe Kneipp. She also finished runner-up in the women's doubles at the 2006 World Doubles Squash Championships, partnering Sarah Fitz-Gerald.

External links 
 

1972 births
Living people
Australian female squash players
Commonwealth Games silver medallists for Australia
Commonwealth Games bronze medallists for Australia
Commonwealth Games medallists in squash
Squash players at the 1998 Commonwealth Games
Squash players at the 2002 Commonwealth Games
21st-century Australian women
Medallists at the 1998 Commonwealth Games
Medallists at the 2002 Commonwealth Games